Ekenäs Sport Club (abbreviated ESC) is a football club from Ekenäs, Raseborg in Finland. The club was formed in 2007 and their home ground is Ekenäs Centrumplan.  The club is currently playing in the Kakkonen, the third tier of the Finnish league system.

External links
Official Website

Football clubs in Finland
Association football clubs established in 2007
2007 establishments in Finland